Jackson County Courthouse in Kansas City, Missouri is located at 415 East 12th Street in Downtown Kansas City and houses judicial and administrative offices for the western portion of the county.

It was built in 1934, designed by Wight and Wight in an Art Deco style. Harry S. Truman, presiding judge of the Jackson County Court at the time, wanted it designed similar to the Caddo Parish, Louisiana courthouse in Shreveport, Louisiana by Edward F. Neild. The latter architect was hired as consulting architect-engineer.  Neild was later commissioned to design the Truman Presidential Library, but died before it was completed.

History
In 1872 an unfinished hotel building located at 2nd and Main St was adapted by Asa Beebe Cross for use as the Jackson County Courthouse.

In 1922, Harry S. Truman won election as county judge for eastern Jackson County as a candidate of the Tom Pendergast faction of the Democratic Party. He failed to be re-elected in 1924, but won election as presiding judge in 1926. Truman served in this position, in effect as county commissioner, for eight years. He divided his time between this courthouse and the eastern courthouse in Independence.

Current courthouse
This building replaced the previous Kansas City courthouse annex at 5th and Oak, which officials deemed unsafe. Voters approved a $4 million bond issue in 1931 for construction of the courthouse and adjacent Kansas City City Hall; the structure was dedicated in December 1934. Truman maintained an office in the new courthouse building during most of his first term as U.S. Senator, from 1935 to 1939.

The courthouse contains an elaborate painted ceiling on the second floor featuring portraits of county employees. The mural was completed by artist Chris Doyle in 2006. In the lobby are five medallions representing Faith, Authority, Justice, Aspiration, and Progress, sculpted in white and bronze by Kansas City sculptor Jorgen Dreyer.

References

County courthouses in Missouri
Skyscraper office buildings in Kansas City, Missouri
Art Deco architecture in Missouri

Government buildings completed in 1934
Downtown Kansas City
1934 establishments in Missouri